Jordan Phosphate Mines (JPMC) is a mining company based in Amman, Jordan.  The company operates 3 mining facilities in Jordan and a chemical manufacturing complex in Aqaba.  The company is listed on the Amman Stock Exchange's ASE Weighted Index as "JOPH".

Background
Jordan Phosphate Mines was founded in 1949.

In 1986, JPMC bought the Jordan Fertilizer Company. JPMC already controlled 25% of the fertilizing company before its full acquisition. Jordan Fertilizer was operating a chemical and fertilizer manufacturing complex in Aqaba, which became the property of JPMC.

In 2007, JPMC signed a memorandum of understanding with the Indian Farmers Fertiliser Cooperative (IFFCO), India's largest fertilizer manufacturer. In 2013, the partnership was renewed for one year, committing JPMC to deliver 2 million tonnes of phosphate in a year.

In the first semester of 2014, JPMC recorded a net loss of $9.4 million, mainly due to lower commodity prices and higher fuel costs.

In April 2016, JPMC raised JD82.5 million. In February 2017, JPMC signed a memorandum of understanding with the government of Bangladesh to provide the country with 270,000 metric tonnes of phosphate and phosphoric acid within 3 years for $280 million. In May 2018, IFFCO and Indian Potash Limited (IPL) bought a 37% share in JPMC from the Brunei Investment Agency for $130 million. 60% of JPMC's production was already exported to india by the time of this purchase.

Operations

Mining
According to the company's website, more than 60% of the area of Jordan has phosphate deposits at minable depth. JPMC is the only phosphate-mining company in Jordan. JPMC's three mining facilities are located in:

Manufacturing
JPMC's al-Aqaba complex produces fertilizer and chemicals, including:
Phosphoric acid - used to make fertilizers, detergents, pharmaceuticals, steel and cola ;
Diammonium phosphate - DAP fertilizer ;
Sulphuric acid - many uses ;
Aluminium fluoride - used as a catalyst in the manufacture of aluminium and magnesium; used as a ceramic glaze.

Partnerships and joint-ventures
JPMC runs the Indo-Jordan Chemicals, co-owned with Southern Petrochemical Industries of India and The Arab Investment Company of Saudi Arabia.

JPMC runs the Nippon Jordan Fertilizer Company, a joint venture with the Arab Potash Company and a consortium of Japanese companies (ZEN-NOH, Mitsubishi Corporation, Mitsubishi Chemical, Asahi Kasei).

JPMC runs the PT Petro Jordan Abadi, a joint venture with the Indonesian company Petrokimia Gresik.

Incidents
In June 2013, the uncle of the King of Jordan, Walid Kurdi, was found guilty of illegally profiting by using his position of CEO of JPMC. The justice fined him JD284 million. In August 2017, JPMC filed for an arrest warrant with Interpol to extradite Walid Kurdi who fled the country and was living as a fugitive.

References

External links
Official website

Mining companies of Jordan
Chemical companies
Phosphate mining
Companies based in Amman
Companies listed on the Amman Stock Exchange